Maiwar is an electoral district of the Legislative Assembly in the Australian state of Queensland, incorporating the inner western suburbs of Brisbane. It was created in the 2017 redistribution, and was first  contested at the 2017 Queensland state election. The name of the electorate is stated by the government as being based on an Aboriginal name for the Brisbane River, however it is not the name that the Turrbal people who lived in the Brisbane region had for the river. The Brisbane River forms the southern boundary of the electorate.

It largely replaces areas of the abolished districts of Mount Coot-tha and Indooroopilly, north of the Brisbane River. Maiwar consists of the suburbs of Mount Coot-tha, Bardon, Auchenflower, Toowong, Taringa, Indooroopilly, St Lucia and Fig Tree Pocket.

At its creation, Maiwar was estimated to be a marginal seat for the Liberal National Party with a margin of 3.0%. The seat was however won at the 2017 Queensland state election by Michael Berkman of the Australian Greens.

Members for Maiwar

Election results

See also
 Electoral districts of Queensland
 Members of the Queensland Legislative Assembly by year
 :Category:Members of the Queensland Legislative Assembly by name

References

Electoral districts of Queensland